The Provencher Bridge is a bridge across the Red River in Winnipeg, Manitoba. The bridge links downtown Winnipeg with St. Boniface, a Winnipeg community across the Red River. The Provencher Bridge derived its name from the connecting Boulevard Provencher (Provencher Boulevard).

The bridge serves Route 57 and is a main connector from downtown Winnipeg to most of the eastern communities in Winnipeg.  The speed limit on the bridge is 50 km/h (31 mph).

Bridge history

Ferries
The first way of crossing the Red River was by ferry linking Broadway on the west with Provencher Blvd on the east. The ferry route was cancelled in 1882 with the opening of the first bridge. It sank on the Assiniboine River later that same year.

The first bridge
The first bridge (the "old bridge") was originally named the Broadway bridge because it connected with Broadway on the other side, which is in direct line of sight with Provencher. Construction began in 1881 and was completed in April 1882. Disaster struck three days later, wiping away two spans of the bridge, but repairs were completed later that same month. The bridge was demolished in 1917 after a proposal for a newer one.

The second bridge
The second bridge was opened in 1918 to replace the old Broadway bridge. Instead of linking with Broadway, it was oriented slightly to the north; traffic crossing from the east was sent even further north, eventually connecting with Main Street about 500 metres from Broadway. Construction began in 1911 and was completed in 1912. Streetcars began operating on the bridge on December 3, 1925. The second bridge was dismantled in 2001 for the opening of the third (current) bridge.

The third bridge

The third bridge (the "modern bridge") actually consists of two bridges, a vehicular bridge and a pedestrian bridge. The vehicular bridge's plan was originally designed to connect York and St. Mary Avenues to Provencher Boulevard, but it was cancelled in 1997. The lands for the St. Mary–York–Provencher connection were used for the construction of the Canadian Museum for Human Rights. The vehicular bridge was constructed in 2001 and completed in September 2003. The pedestrian bridge was constructed later, and was completed the same year.

The vehicular bridge
The vehicular part of the modern bridge is slightly curved, unlike the old bridge which was completely straight and at a slight angle. Construction of the vehicular bridge began on July 20, 2001. Two years later, in September, the vehicular bridge was completed.

The pedestrian bridge

The pedestrian bridge, or the Esplanade Riel (Named for Louis Riel), parallels the new Broadway bridge, and is a side-spar cable-stayed bridge designed by Architects Guy Préfontaine and Étienne Gaboury and Colin Douglas Stewart of Wardrop Engineering.

The Esplanade Riel features a restaurant in the middle of the bridge.  Originally operated by Salisbury House, the restaurant space was home to Chez Sophie Sur Le Pont from summer 2013 to February 2015. The bridge's new tenant, Mon Ami Louis, opened in July 2015 as an "approachable and eschewing the haute cuisine haughtiness of French dining".

Construction on the bridge began in August 2002, and was completed in 2003, the same year as the vehicular bridge, and was officially opened in the summer of 2004.

See also
 List of bridges in Canada
 List of bridges

External links

Provencher bridge

References 

Road bridges in Manitoba
Buildings and structures in Winnipeg
Bridges completed in 2003
Saint Boniface, Winnipeg
Buildings and structures in downtown Winnipeg